Tan Sri Khoo Kay Peng (born December 1939) is a Malaysian Chinese businessman. He is the chairman and a major shareholder of Laura Ashley plc, and the owner of MUI Group.

Early life
Khoo Kay Peng was born in December 1939.

Career
Khoo was mentored by Khoo Teck Puat, who founded Malayan Banking in 1960. Khoo  joined the new bank and soon became a manager. In 1965, he was seconded to Bank Bumiputra, and quickly rose to a senior position. In his ten years there, he built relationships with Tengku Razaleigh Hamzah, Robert Kuok and Tan Koon Swan.

He left in 1976 to start his own business, developing property in Kuala Lumpur with a loan from Southern Banking, which made him a millionaire. In 1976, he bought a major stake in MUI Group, then a manufacturer of toothbrushes and household utensils, and used it as a vehicle for a series of corporate takeovers, growing MUI to a $91 million pre-tax profit in 1984.

Khoo operated for some time from 1980 from Australia, initially in Perth and later in Melbourne, but moved to the UK in the 1990s.

He is the owner of MUI Group, a conglomerate which includes "retail, hotel, food and financial-services interests in Asia, Australia, the U.S. and the U.K." according to Forbes. He also owned 44% of Laura Ashley plc and serves as its chairman. He is a director of Corus Hotels.

He is the 44th richest person in Malaysia, with an estimated wealth of US$300 million according to Forbes. However, the Financial Times suggested he was worth an estimated £400 million in February 2014.

Personal life
Khoo married Pauline Chai in 1970 when Chai was 24 and he was 31, shortly after she won the Miss Malaysia beauty contest. Chai first became pregnant in 1971, and they have five children—Alfred, Andrew, Angelina, Angeline and Alex.

He and his wife divorced in 2013 after 43 years together. He resides in Kuala Lumpur, Malaysia. His wife resides at Rossway, an estate in Hertfordshire, England. Their ongoing divorce has led to the revelation of personal details.

Khoo's daughter, Angeline married Jedidiah Francis, a Caribbean-born data scientist of Indian descent, and he refused to give them blessings to get married, resulting Khoo and his daughter no longer talking to each other. Khoo insisted that he would not accept Francis as his son-in-law.

Honours
 :
 Commander of the Order of Loyalty to the Crown of Malaysia (P.S.M.) - Tan Sri (1986)

References

1939 births
Living people
People from Kuala Lumpur
Malaysian businesspeople
Commanders of the Order of Loyalty to the Crown of Malaysia